Curraghbinny, also sometimes spelled Currabinny or Currabinney, is a townland in County Cork, Ireland. As of the 2011 census, Curraghbinny townland had a population of 155 people.

Lough Beg Bird Reserve and Curraghbinny Wood are located in the area. The cairn, which was subject to excavation in the 1930s (during which cremated human remains and a bronze ring were found), was restored in the 1990s. There is a plaque to the Irish-Canadian politician, William Warren Baldwin, within the wood.

There is a large pharmaceutical manufacturing plant, which was acquired by Thermo Fisher Scientific from GlaxoSmithKline for €90m in 2019, in Curraghbinny townland.

See also
 Crosshaven
 River Owenabue

References

Townlands of County Cork